R. Carlton Ward Jr. is a photographer with National Geographic Society. The Edge of Africa was his first book, a result of eight months in the tropical rain forests of Gabon. He documented Mali's elephants in Mali for the cover of Smithsonian Magazine and a chapter in the National Geographic book Great Migrations. His book Conservation Photography was a product of his masters thesis on ecology. In 2009 his book Florida Cowboys was published. It earned a silver medal at the Florida Book Awards.

Ward founded the Legacy Institute for Nature & Culture (LINC), a non-profit group advocating for the protection of Florida’s natural and cultural heritage through art.

Ward was featured in Popular Photography Magazine as part of a profile of three photographers working to save "vanishing America". He helped organize and led The Florida Wildlife Corridor Expedition.

Ward is a founding fellow of the International League of Conservation Photographers.

Additionally, Ward is a great-grandson of Florida's 25th governor, Doyle E. Carlton.

References

External links
 

Living people
American photographers
Nature photographers
Year of birth missing (living people)